The Thompsie Edwards House is a historic house in Lexington, Tennessee, U.S.. It was built in 1894 for Thompsie Edwards, a livery yard owner, banker and Republican politician. The porch was designed in the Eastlake architectural style. The property has been listed on the National Register of Historic Places since June 30, 1983.

References

National Register of Historic Places in Henderson County, Tennessee
Victorian architecture in Tennessee
Houses completed in 1894